Fistful of Frags is a multiplayer Western Half-Life 2 first-person shooter mod that involves team-based or free-for-all shootouts and cooperative games against AI managed enemies. It was released on Steam for Microsoft Windows, Mac OS and Linux on May 9, 2014, with several updates subsequently adding features and maps.

Gameplay 
The game supports between 12 and 20 players simultaneously, filling in empty player slots with AI enemies if there are less than 12 players. Many weapons notable for appearing in Wild West media are available, including the Colt Peacemaker, Derringer, Mare's Leg, Sharps Rifle, Henry rifle, and Coachgun. Single-handed weapons may optionally be dual wielded. Fistful of Frags also has a unique weapons selection system in which stars are used to balance the guns, secondaries, or handedness a player may use. The player can weigh the star cost of their primary and secondaries to achieve an advantageous loadout. Handedness (left or right) also has significant implications towards accuracy. The stars can also be used to spend on perks such as stronger kicks or punches, or being able to carry dynamite or explosive barrels (which can be found around maps).

Games may be free-for-all or have up to 4 teams: Desperados, Vigilantes, Rangers, or Banditos. Factions are represented on the scoreboard and in various parts of the HUD by the colors: Blue for Vigilantes, red for Desperados, green for Rangers, and yellow for Banditos. Though the four factions are distinct in look and team color and have different voicelines, there is no difference between each faction in gameplay.
Guns in the game tend to be slow in firing rates and reload speeds, but make up in having relatively high damage compared to other guns in multiplayer source engine games. Rifles such as the Smith or Spencer carbine tend to have an even slower firing rate compared to other guns such as pistols, but make up in damage to the point of killing instantly on a headshot and dealing half of one's entire health pool on one body shot. Pistols (usually revolvers or an older variant of a modern day pistol such as a volcanic pistol) are used in a faster manner than rifles, as they not only have a faster base firing speed, but also have the option to "fan" the firing hammer. More weapons such as bows, brass knuckles, and throwing knives are also available. Brass knuckles are rarely used as a primary weapon, but can be useful as a last resort. Throwing knives are generally used in the same way; however, they have the option of throwing them if the enemy is not quite in melee range, but still close enough range to make rifles ineffective. Bows are alternatives to other long ranged weapons such as the rifle. They are harder to use, but deal more damage from farther ranges. Shotguns are also included in the game, but are usually more rare to see as they are very situational. Although being ineffective at mid to long ranges, shotguns are devastating at close range, with some variants even instantly killing with one shot to the torso. Kicking is a unique mechanic in the game; however, kicks only work at melee range, and are most effective at knocking enemies off high areas or staggering enemies to make them easier to shoot.

There are crates in the game which can be used to get more powerful variants of base guns obtainable at the start of one's life. There are multiple different types of crates. Blue crates are the most common, red crates are the second rarest, and gold crates are the rarest. Only one gold crate exists on each map (besides ones that drop from enemies with high kill streaks). When opening a chest, a player has the option of choosing between several weapons which compliment a variety of play styles. Gold crates dropped from killing high kill streak players drop several random weapons, including at least two random gold-ranked weapons.

A strategy for dealing with enemies at close range when using a rifle is to shoot the enemy once to weaken them, then switching to a melee weapon such as brass knuckles, knives, axes, or machetes to finish the opponent off. Another strategy is to not use guns entirely, and just use melee weapons. Some advantage of this play style include faster movement speed, as using no guns results in a faster base movement speed, and combat that does not require aiming. 

The game has a unique healing system, as instead of using conventional healing items such as food, health packs, bandages, or medicine, an injured player can instead drink whiskey. Whenever a player drinks whiskey, it is harder to aim for a limited time, which prevents one from being able to heal in the middle of a fight without consequence. A popular line in the game is "pass the whiskey", which is used whenever a player want to alert their teammates that they need healing. The intended purpose of this command is for players who do not wish to use a microphone or text chat; however, the line has become a meme, and is rarely used for this purpose.

Reception 
PC Zone reviewed the original mod version of the game, calling its maps "well-designed, well-crafted and large." However, they criticized the game's short-ranged weapons as "underpowered," calling it "far more satisfying to play medium to long-range."

Phil Savage of PC Gamer called the game "unapologetically old-school FPS" and "worth checking out, if just for the fast and silly FPS action," but criticized it as "pretty janky in places." Christopher Livingston of the same publication awarded it "Mod of the Week," praising the dual-wielding mechanic and calling the game "a whole lot of fun."

References

External links
 
 Steam page

2007 video games
First-person shooters
Linux games
Multiplayer online games
Source (game engine) mods
Western (genre) video games
Windows games